The 1899 SAFL Grand Final was an Australian rules football competition.  beat  42 to 14.

References 

SANFL Grand Finals
SAFL Grand Final, 1899
September 1899 sports events